Eldra Clemond Buckley (born June 23, 1985) is  former American football running back. He was signed by the San Diego Chargers as an undrafted free agent in 2007, after playing college football at the University of Tennessee at Chattanooga.

Buckley has also played for the Philadelphia Eagles and the Detroit Lions.

Early years
Buckley attended Charleston High School in Charleston, Mississippi and was a letterman in football and track. In football, he was a starter as a running back. In track, as a senior, he placed sixth at the Mississippi Outdoor State Class 3A Meet on the 110 meter high hurdles.

College career
At Northwest Mississippi Community College in Senatobia, Mississippi, Buckley accounted for 1,300 yards and 12 touchdowns on 160 carries for the Rangers in 2004. 140 yards per game on the ground for the Rangers and earned Junior College All-America honors as well as Most Valuable Player of the Mississippi Junior College North Division Ranked No. 23 among junior college players. Buckley finished at Northwest with 160 rushes for 1,300 yards and 12 touchdowns in 2004.

Despite only playing two years for Chattanooga, Buckley is fourth on the Mocs’ all-time rushing list. He totaled 2,437 yards in two seasons and holds the No. 1 and No. 2 marks on UTC’s single season rushing list. The 1,204 yards he amassed in his senior year is second only to the 1,233 yards he piled up in his junior campaign.

He became the leader of the offense and was the 2006 recipient of the Woodrow Wolford Sr. Football Scholarship.

Professional career

Pre-draft measurables

San Diego Chargers
Buckley was not drafted in the 2007 NFL Draft, but was signed by the San Diego Chargers as a free agent. He was on the team's practice squad during the 2007 season and 2008 season. He was waived on February 26, 2009.

Philadelphia Eagles
Buckley was claimed off waivers by the Philadelphia Eagles on March 9, 2009. Due to his performance in the preseason, the Eagles chose to keep him on the roster, cutting Lorenzo Booker instead.

He scored his first touchdown in a game against the Washington Redskins on November 29th, 2009. 

He was given an exclusive-rights free agent tender and was re-signed to a one-year contract on July 30, 2011. He was released during final roster cuts on September 3.

Detroit Lions
The Detroit Lions signed Buckley following the placement of Jerome Harrison on the reserve/non-football injury list on October 21, 2011. He was released on November 7 in order to make room for free agent signings.

Personal life
Buckley's father, James, is the mayor of Oakland, Mississippi.

References

External links

Philadelphia Eagles bio
San Diego Chargers bio

1985 births
Living people
People from Charleston, Mississippi
American football running backs
Northwest Mississippi Rangers football players
Chattanooga Mocs football players
San Diego Chargers players
Philadelphia Eagles players
Detroit Lions players